The Defense of Harbin occurred during the early Second Sino-Japanese War, as part of the campaign of the Invasion of Manchuria by forces of the Empire of Japan from 25 January to 4 February 1932.

Background
After General Ma Zhanshan had been driven from Tsitsihar by the Japanese in the Jiangqiao Campaign, he retreated northeast with his depleted forces and set up his headquarters at Hailun, from which he attempted to continue to govern Heilongjiang province. Colonel Kenji Doihara began negotiations with General Ma Zhanshan from his Special Service Office at Harbin, hoping to get him to defect to the new state of Manchukuo. Ma remained in an ambiguous position, continuing negotiations with the Japanese, while he continued to support General Ting Chao.

General Ting Chao had never approved of the puppet government set up in Kirin Province by the Kwantung Army under the nominal leadership of General Xi Qia of the Kirin Army. In November 1932, with Colonel Feng Zhanhai, he organized the “Jilin Provincial Anti-Japanese Government” to coordinate military resistance. Military and civil authorities in the province fractured into "New Kirin" adherents of the Xi Qia regime and loyalist "Old Kirin" elements in opposition to it; the former predominated near the capital and the latter predominating in Harbin and the rugged hinterland to the north and east.

Over the next months General Ma Zhanshan continued to support General Ting Chao, and these two Generals maintained contact with Marshal Zhang Xueliang and Chiang Kai-shek, who gave them some limited assistance. In early January 1932, in an effort to force General Ma Zhanshan to terms, Doihara requested that General Xi Qia to advance with his "New Kirin Army" to take Harbin, and to then advance in the direction of Ma's headquarters at Hailun. However, the forces of the Jilin Self-Defence Army organized by General Ting Chao and General Li Du, at Harbin were in between General Xi Qia and Harbin. General Ting Chao appealed to Harbin's Chinese residents to join his railway garrison regulars.

When General Xi Qia's New Kirin Army had advanced to Shuangcheng on 25 January, Marshal Zhang Xueliang instructed Generals Ma Zhanshan and Ting Chao not to negotiate further, and fighting began on the morning of the 26th. Doihara had failed in his attempt to intimidate the Chinese and worse still his ally, General Xi Qia had suffered a serious reverse at the hands of General Ting Chao's forces.

The Harbin Incident
In order to justify the direct intervention of the Kwantung Army to assist General Xi Qia, Colonel Doihara engineered a riot in Harbin. During the uprising, one Japanese and three Korean subjects of Japan were killed. Although most Japanese forces had been withdrawn from northern Manchuria for use in the Chinchow Operation; but the 2nd Infantry Division, commanded by Lieutenant General Jirō Tamon, had returned to Mukden for a rest.

On receiving orders to go to the rescue of General Xi Qia, the 2nd Division entrained on the same day that the January 28 Incident began. Some delays were experienced because of transportation difficulties in the cold winter weather. This gave General Ting Chao time to seize the Municipal Administration in Harbin and arrest pro-Japanese Governor of Heilungkiang General Zhang Jinghui.

From Tsitsihar the newly arrived Japanese 4th Mixed Brigade moved in from the east. For seven days Japanese columns struggled over the frozen countryside in temperatures of 30° below zero. Finally they closed in on the city from the west and south on February 4.

Battle of Harbin
General Ting Chao fought a 17-hour battle, which Harbin's inhabitants watched from their rooftops. Possibly in an effort to embroil Russia, Ting Chao's artillery was posted in front of the offices of the Soviet-dominated Chinese Eastern Railroad, but to no effect. Ting Chao's men, many of whom were poorly equipped and untrained civilian volunteers, finally broke under the fire from Japanese guns and the bombing and strafing by Japanese aircraft. General Ting was forced to retreat from Harbin to the northeast, down the Sungari River, pursued by Japanese aircraft. Within a few hours the Japanese occupation of Harbin was complete.

Aftermath
Doihara offered Ma Zhanshan one million dollars in gold to defect to the new Manchukuo Imperial Army. With General Ting Chao's defeated, Ma Zhanshan agreed on 14 February 1932 and retained his post as Governor of Heilungkiang Province in exchange for cooperating with the Japanese.

On February 27, 1932, General Ting Chao, offered to cease hostilities, ending official Chinese resistance in Manchuria.

Within days Henry Puyi, Manchurian former emperor of China, deposed in 1911, was made emperor of the puppet state of Manchukuo by the resolution of an All-Manchuria convention at Mukden, whose members included General Ma Zhanshan flown in from the north. The next day on March 1 the Manchukuo Government established with Ma Zhanshan as its Minister of War, in addition to his post as provincial governor.

Bibliography

External links
 International Military Tribunal for the Far East Japanese Aggression Against China
  "Flight of Ting". Time. 15 February 1932.
  Topographic Map nl52-7 Ha-erh-pin Shuangcheng, Harbin area

Military history of Manchuria
History of Harbin
Harbin
1932 in China
Conflicts in 1932
1932 in Japan
January 1932 events
February 1932 events